The United Carriage and Baggage Transfer Building is an historic building in Portland, Oregon's Old Town Chinatown neighborhood, completed in 1886 (another source says 1875).  It is a contributing property in the Portland Skidmore/Old Town Historic District, which was listed on the U.S. National Register of Historic Places in 1975 and designated a National Historic Landmark District in 1977.  Its ground floor currently houses the Pine Street Market.

The building was designated a Portland Historic Landmark by the city's Historic Landmarks Commission in 1969.  It had been the location of The Old Spaghetti Factory's first restaurant and the youth dance club Quest.

References

1886 establishments in Oregon
Buildings and structures completed in 1886
Buildings and structures in Portland, Oregon
Individually listed contributing properties to historic districts on the National Register in Oregon
Old Town Chinatown
Portland Historic Landmarks
Southwest Portland, Oregon
National Historic Landmark District contributing properties
Historic district contributing properties in Oregon